The Terrebonne Parish-class tank landing ship was a class of tank landing ship of United States Navy and later sold to the Spanish, Hellenic, Peruvian, Venezuelan and Turkish Navy.

Development 
In the 1950s, fifteen ships were authorized to begin construction by three shipbuilding companies (Bath Iron Works, Ingalls Shipbuilding and Christy Shipbuilding). Three batches of five ships were built by each companies from 1952 until 1954. Several ships proceed to serve in the Vietnam War.

All ships were put out of service in the United States from 1970 to 1973, with many being transferred to foreign service which some were in service until the mid-2010s.

Washtenaw County was sold for commercial service but was abandoned in 1980 in which she remained afloat at the Columbia River as of 6 December 2021. The ship has been heavily vandalized and stripped of parts throughout the years but despite that, efforts were still being done to repair and make her into a museum ship. She is also the only ship converted into a mine sweeper from her class.

Ships of class

Citations

 

Terrebonne Parish-class tank landing ships
Amphibious warfare vessel classes
Tank landing ships